Ambiapur is a Block & village panchayat in Budaun district, Uttar Pradesh, India. The block number of Ambiapur is 178. There are 89 villages in Ambiapur block. According to 2011 Census of India, the total population is 185007. Out of this, 98605 are males and 86402 are females.

Villages under Ambiapur block

Akauli
Ambiapur
Angaul
Badrauni
Badshahpur
Bagarpur Sagarpur
Bain
Bairmai Khurd
Bamed
Banbehta
Bansbaraulia
Baramai Buzurg
Barnidhakpur
Barnighat
Basawanpur
Behtagusain
Behtajabi
Bhatri Govardhanpur
Bhikampur Hardopatti
Bichaula
Chholayan
Dabihari
Dhadoomar
Dhanauli
Din Nagar Sheikhpur
Dudhani
Faqirabad
Fateh Nagla
Fatehullaha Ganj
Garhauli
Garhi
Gatarpur
Gudhni
Haidalpur
Haivatpur
Hardaspur
Harganpur
Hasupur Baheriya
Jahanabad
Jarawan
Jarsaini
Jinaura
Karanpur
Katinna 
Khairati Nagar
Khairi
Khausara
Kherha
Khulet
Kurdarni
Mirzapur Shohra
Mohammadganj
Mooseypur
Mustafabad Tappa Ahamadnagar
Nagarjhoona
Nagla Dallu
Nagla Tarau
Naipindari
Nizampur
Oya
Paharpur
Palpur
Pindaul
Pusgawan
Raipur Buzurg
Rampur Mazra
Rampur Tanda
Risauli
Rudeina Ghangholi
Rujhan
Sabdalpur
Sadarpur
Sahaspur
Sateti Patti Choora
Sateti Patti Inchha
Sateti Patti Sukhat
Satetipatti Gaja
Serasaulpatti Kunwarsahai
Shahbazpur
Shahzadnagar
Siddhpur Chitrasen
Simribhojpur
Sirasaul Patti Seetaram
Sirasaulpatti Jasa
Sirtaul
Sundar Nagar
Surajpur
Tigora Isapur
Ulikhya

References

Blocks in Budaun District
Villages in Budaun district